The Fightin' Comeback is a 1927 American silent Western film directed by Tenny Wright and starring Buddy Roosevelt, Clara Horton and Sidney M. Goldin.

Cast
 Buddy Roosevelt as Jim Jones 
 Clara Horton as Goldie Lamont 
 Sidney M. Goldin as Sam Phillips 
 Richard Neill as Three-Card Spencer 
 Robert Homans as Sheriff Beasley 
 Charles Thurston as Boulder City Sheriff 
 Richard Alexander as Red Pollock

References

External links
 

1927 films
1927 Western (genre) films
Pathé Exchange films
American black-and-white films
Films directed by Tenny Wright
Silent American Western (genre) films
1920s English-language films
1920s American films